Bernard Joseph Eastwood (1932 – 9 March 2020) was an Irish bookmaker and boxing promoter. 
Eastwood was introduced to boxing through weekly tournaments at a US air base near his home and by the tutelage he received from a school teacher from County Cork. 

Eastwood was born in Cookstown, County Tyrone, Northern Ireland. At 19 years of age he was married, to his wife Frances, and was living in Carrickfergus running a pub and assisting in the running of a local boxing club. In the late 1950s, Eastwood was running small boxing shows in Belfast.

Eastwood was well known first as a successful bookmaker for many years. Amongst the boxers he later promoted were Barry McGuigan and Dave McAuley. However, after McGuigan's surprise defeat to Steve Cruz in Las Vegas, United States the relationship between the two soured and this led to a costly and acrimonious legal battle. Eastwood was represented by media lawyer Paul Tweed.

During the 1980s and 1990s, Eastwood ran "Eastwood's Gym" along with John Breen on Belfast's King Street. In February 2008 it was announced that Eastwood would be selling his chain of 54 betting shops to the UK chain Ladbrokes for £135 million.

He died in Ulster Hospital, Dundonald, on the outskirts of Belfast on 9 March 2020, aged 87, after a short illness.

Notable fighters promoted
Barry McGuigan
Crisanto España
Paul Hodkinson
Noel Magee
Ray Close
Dave Boy McAuley
Víctor Córdoba
Fabrice Benichou

References

External links
Profile on Britishboxing.net
Eastwoods Bookmakers 

1932 births
People from Cookstown
2020 deaths
Boxing promoters from Northern Ireland
Bookmakers